The 2021 Oklahoma Sooners football team represented the University of Oklahoma during the 2021 NCAA Division I FBS football season, the 127th season for the Oklahoma Sooners. They played their home games at Gaylord Family Oklahoma Memorial Stadium in Norman, Oklahoma. They are a charter member of the Big 12 Conference. The team was led during the regular season by Lincoln Riley, in his fifth and final year as head coach.

Riley departed Oklahoma for USC on November 28. Former Sooners head coach Bob Stoops was named the interim head coach and led the team to their win in the Alamo Bowl.

Previous season 
The Sooners finished the 2020 season 9–2, 6–2 in Big 12 play. Despite beginning the season 1–2, 0–2 in Big 12 play, they came back and finished the season in 2nd place in the Big 12 behind Iowa State, who they defeated in the 2020 Big 12 Championship Game 27-21 for their sixth consecutive Big 12 Championship. For the first time since 2016, the Sooners were not selected for the College Football Playoff. Instead, the sixth-ranked Sooners were selected to face the seventh-ranked SEC East Champion Florida Gators in the Cotton Bowl, where they defeated the Gators 55–20. They finished the season ranked 6th in the AP and Coaches Poll.

Offseason

Position key

Offseason departures

Recruiting

Transfers

Outgoing

The Oklahoma Sooners lost seventeen players via transfer portal for the 2021 season.

Incoming

The Oklahoma Sooners add nine players via transfer portal from the 2020 season.

Returning starters

Offense

Defense

Special teams

† Indicates player was a starter in 2020 but missed all of 2021 due to injury.

2021 NFL draft

NFL Combine

The official list of participants for the 2021 NFL Combine included Oklahoma football players: -

Team players drafted into the NFL

Preseason

Award watch lists
Listed in the order that they were released

Big 12 media days

Big 12 media poll

Preseason awards
2021 Preseason All-Big 12

Offensive player of the year: Spencer Rattler, QB, Oklahoma
Newcomer of the Year: Eric Gray, RB, Oklahoma

Personnel

Roster

Coaching staff

Graduate assistants

Analysts

Depth chart

Injury report

Schedule

Spring Game

Regular season
The 2021 schedule consists of 7 home games, 4 away games and 1 neutral-site game in the regular season. The Sooners will host 2 non-conference games against Western Carolina and Nebraska and was originally scheduled to travel to Tulane, but the effects of Hurricane Ida forced the game to be played in Oklahoma with Tulane still being the home team. Oklahoma will host Iowa State, TCU, Texas Tech, and West Virginia, and travel to Baylor, Kansas, Kansas State, and Oklahoma State in regular-season conference play. Oklahoma will play Texas in Dallas, Texas at the Cotton Bowl Stadium in the Red River Showdown, the 116th game played in the series.

Game summaries

at Tulane

vs. Western Carolina

vs. Nebraska

vs West Virginia

at Kansas State

vs. No. 21 Texas

vs. TCU

at Kansas

vs. Texas Tech

at No. 13 Baylor

vs. Iowa State

at No. 7 Oklahoma State

vs. Oregon (2021 Alamo Bowl)

Statistics

Scoring

Scores by quarter (non-conference opponents)

Scores by quarter (Big 12 opponents)

Scores by quarter (All opponents)

Rankings

Awards and honors

Postseason

Bowl game

References

Oklahoma
Oklahoma Sooners football seasons
Alamo Bowl champion seasons
Oklahoma Sooners football